Ectoedemia marmaropa is a moth of the family Nepticulidae. It was described by Annette Frances Braun in 1925. It is known from North America, including Utah, Wyoming, Ohio, Alberta, British Columbia, Newfoundland, and California.

The wingspan is 4.2-4.4 mm. The forewings are dark brown with bronze and golden reflections, becoming irrorate (speckled) distally.

The larvae feed on Rosa woodsii and Rosa californica. They mine the leaves of their host plant. The mine begins as a very narrow linear mine, but abruptly enlarges into a blotch which may consume half the area of the leaf. The frass is scattered throughout the blotch.

References

External links

Nepticulidae
Moths described in 1925
Moths of North America

Taxa named by Annette Frances Braun